Jo Gwang was chief retainer of Gaya confederacy. Queen Hogu who was a wife of Mapum of Geumgwan Gaya was his granddaughter. He served as government officer of Gaya confederacy. In 48, when Heo Hwang-ok came over from India to Gaya confederacy, he also came from India as an attendant of Heo Hwang-ok who married into Gaya confederacy.

Family 
Consort: Moryang
Granddaughter: Queen Hogu

References 

Korean people of Indian descent
Gaya confederacy
Gaya confederacy people
Year of birth unknown
Year of death unknown
1st-century Korean people